The COVID-19 vaccination campaign in Turkey began on 14 January 2021. ,  people have received their first dose, and  people have been fully vaccinated. Also,  people received their third dose.

The population of Turkey is approximately 83 million, thus 63% of the population is fully vaccinated. In order to enter turkey you will need to have received 2 vaccinations and 1 booster jab.

Effect of vaccine 

Public perception of vaccine 
Through a study done on the population of Turkey's perception of the COVID-19 vaccine, it was shown that only 62.7% of participants had a positive perception of the vaccine. Specifically, people with previous experience with COVID-19, people with bachelor's degrees or higher, and people with experience with influenza vaccines were more likely to have a positive perception of the COVID-19 vaccine. However, older people were more likely to have a negative perception of the vaccine.

Vaccines on order 

There are several COVID-19 vaccines at various stages of development around the world. Turkey currently uses 4 different vaccines.

Vaccination statistics

Gallery

References 

2021 in Turkey
January 2021 events in Europe
February 2021 events in Europe
March 2021 events in Europe
COVID-19 pandemic in Turkey
Turkey